My Turn on Earth is a Latter Day Saints musical written by Carol Lynn Pearson with music by Lex de Azevedo. The show premiered in 1977 and became widely popular, ranking with the other popular musical  Saturday's Warrior. A VHS version of a recorded stage production was released in 1986. The first DVD version (Original Cast Edition) was distributed worldwide through the Deseret Book Company in June 2008.

Plot 
My Turn on Earth recounts the Church of Jesus Christ of Latter Day Saints' Plan of Salvation. Barbara and her four friends are living in Heaven (the pre-existence). While there, they re-enact the War in Heaven and the shouts for joy of the spirits that are going to be born. They treat mortality as a treasure hunt with returning again to live with Heavenly Father and Mother as the greatest prize to be won. In the end, Barbara returns to Heaven, having learned the necessary lessons.

Songs 

Once Upon A Time
Heaven
I Have A Plan
Shout For Joy
My Turn on Earth
Everybody Ought to have a Body
Choosing
My Story
The Golden Rule
Look for the Little Light
Opposition
Homesick
Where on Earth Can I Find Heaven
It Isn't Good to Be Alone/Eternity Is You
Angel Lullaby
What Does it Take to Make a Family
I'm Not Ready
Forever
My Turn on Earth Finale

The rights to these songs, and to the musical as a whole are currently owned by Excel Entertainment Group.

References 

Pearl of Great Price, Book of Abraham, 3:27-28, 
My Turn On Earth at LDS Audio.com 

Latter Day Saint plays and pageants
1977 musicals